Ryan James Ellis (born November 29, 1989) is an American professional stock car racing driver. He competes part-time in the NASCAR Xfinity Series, driving the No. 43 Chevrolet Camaro for Alpha Prime Racing. He has previously raced in NASCAR Camping World Truck Series and the NASCAR Cup Series.

Racing career

Early career (1994–2005)
A third-generation racecar driver, Ellis began driving Quarter Midgets at age 4 and nearly won the first QMA Dirt National Championship race he ever entered. He then went on to a stellar 7-year career in Quarter Midgets, becoming Virginia's all-time QMA leader and one of the most successful open-wheel racers in the state. A threat in QMA National competition since his debut, Ellis was soon on the lookout for his next conquest.
Entering the Legends scene at the age of 12, Ellis achieved national success campaigning the open-wheel INEX Legends Cars. Winning Young Lion and Semi-Pro titles in 2002, 2003, and 2004, Ellis toured the nation in 2005 as a member of INEX’s elite Legends Pro division, capturing the 2005 Virginia State Pro Championship and finishing 4th in the National Pro Series. Ellis won dozens of Legends features on the Bullrings of Virginia, North Carolina, Pennsylvania, and Ohio. Still today, Ellis returns to the ovals with his Legends Car several times each year.

NASCAR to road racing
Ellis had a short-lived entry into the full-bodied world of NASCAR during 2006. Quickly, Ellis was the NASCAR Late Model Stock Car (LMSC) Rookie pacesetter at his home track, Manassas’ fabled Old Dominion Speedway.  Ellis competed sparingly that spring in both Virginia and North Carolina in NASCAR’s highest Weekly Racing Series division.

In 2006, when he wasn’t running Late Models, he raced his Legends Car, going Road Racing with the National Auto Sport Association, (NASA) where he won the majority of the events he entered. Ryan won the 2006 NASA Hyperfest/Summit Point event, captured the 2006 NASA Mid Atlantic Legends Road Racing Championship, and lost the inaugural 2006 NASA National Championships at Mid Ohio by a mere 2 feet.  At the end of the 2006 season, Ryan was invited, (for the second year in a row) to the 2nd annual Performance Racing Industry National Invitational race at the Orlando Speedworld bullring. In only his second Oval track race of the season with the Legends Car, Ryan qualified in the top ten and was running fifth in the prestigious nationally televised event.

In 2007 Ryan Ellis Racing re-established its own internally managed race programs featuring a Pro Legends Car oval racing entry, and in mid-year they also began contesting a Mazda Spec Miata race car in a partial season of both NASA and SCCA Road Racing. That program led to a full-on 2008 NASA National and Regional Championship chase in the Spec Miata class. In 2008, Ellis finished as runner-up by two points in the NASA Mid Atlantic Spec Miata championship.  He also was the highest-finishing driver from his region at the 2008 NASA Spec Miata Nationals, finished 2nd in the inaugural Mazda Teen Challenge program, and was voted “Driver of the Year” by NASA Mid Atlantic.

Volkswagen Jetta TDI Cup career (2008–2010)
In February 2009, Ellis was selected in a nationwide search by Volkswagen of America as one of only 15 new drivers from North America invited to enter their 2009 Jetta TDI Cup series. When he wasn’t racing somewhere in the TDI Cup, Ellis spent the 2009 season racing his beloved Mazda Spec Miatas with NASA out on the West Coast – where he dominated the 2009 Teen Mazda Challenge and won the season Championship. Ryan also raced at Old Dominion Speedway’s 3/8 oval in 2009, winning another Legends race and driving a NASCAR Late Model once again.
At the end of the 2009 season, Ellis entered the Playboy Mazda MX-5 Cup twin finale(s) at Virginia International Raceway. There he surprised the series regulars by running in the lead pack both days and posting solid top-ten finishes in his first time in an MX-5 Cup car. The 2009 season closed with a coveted invite to the Mazdaspeed Motorsports Development MX-5 Cup Shootout, where Ryan (the youngest of the 5 finalists) finished as the runner-up in the closest competition ever.

TDI Cup career and CTSCC ST Rookie of the Year (2010–2013)
In 2010, Ellis won the first two races of the Volkswagen Jetta TDI Cup season before finishing the season sixth in points. Two wins and two poles, both at Virginia International Raceway,  fastest lap at two races (Mid-Ohio Sports Car Course and VIR), three podiums (VIRx2 and Puebla), led three races VIRginia International Raceway twice, and Road America), and set a new track record at VIR. At the end of the season, he tested with many Grand-Am Continental Tire Sports Car Challenge teams before signing with APR Motorsport for the 2011 season.

At the 2011 season opener for the Continental series at Daytona International Speedway, Ellis broke the track record in qualifying by nearly two seconds, qualified 1st, and won the first race of his rookie season with teammate Ian Baas. He then won at Homestead-Miami Speedway in Round 2 and finished 3rd at the Continental Tire event at Road America resulting in a 3rd-place finish in the overall points standings and winning the ST Rookie of the Year.

Ellis signed with Insight Racing in 2012 and won the 2012 Kia 200 with co-driver Martin Jensen before the team folded due to lack of funding. Ellis was quickly signed to i-MOTO Racing and completed much of the 2012 season with them.

In 2013, Ellis was signed to drive with co-driver Mathew Pombo with i-MOTO Racing again. He qualified on pole at Daytona and led much of the race before retiring due to mechanical failure. Ellis qualified in the top-3 for many races with i-MOTO before being hired by Team SkullCandy Nissan for the balance of the 2013 season.

NASCAR (2014–present)

For 2014, Ellis moved to the NASCAR Camping World Truck Series, driving a partial schedule in the No. 28 fielded by FDNY Racing. In 2014 and 2015, Ellis drove for various of teams in the Xfinity Series and the Truck Series. During the season, Ellis made his Sprint Cup Series debut in the Quicken Loans Race for Heroes 500, driving the No. 33 for Circle Sport. After qualifying 42nd, he finished 40th in the rain-shortened event, eight laps behind race winner Dale Earnhardt Jr. In 2016, Ellis began running multiple races for BK Racing, driving the No. 93 car in the Cup Series with sponsorship from ScienceLogic, starting at Richmond in April.

With a lack of sponsorship available, Ellis became the public relations representative for Go Fas Racing and Matt DiBenedetto. When DiBenedetto left BK Racing after the 2016 season, Ellis was one of the leading candidates to replace him in the seat before drivers with personal funding took over the ride. In addition to his PR roles with GFR, Ellis continued competing part-time in the Xfinity Series with B. J. McLeod Motorsports.

After spending 2020 completely away from the driver's seat, Ellis returned to BJMM in 2021 on a seven-race Xfinity schedule in the No. 99. At Mid-Ohio, Ellis was involved in a late wreck with friend Cody Ware. To make amends, Ware's family team Rick Ware Racing offered Ellis a ride for the Kansas Cup race. In 2022 he joined Alpha Prime Racing in the NASCAR Xfinity Series on a partial schedule. In his first race with Alpha Prime, Ellis scored a career-best 13th place finish at Las Vegas Motor Speedway. On September 15, it was announced that Ellis would return to Alpha Prime Racing for the 2023 season on an expanded, but still part-time schedule.

Personal life
Ellis currently resides in Huntersville, NC with his wife Allison Ellis, who is locally known for her philanthropic endeavors and her love for dogs.

Ellis' parents are Jane Ellis and Jim Ellis of Ashburn, Virginia. He has a younger sister named Kara. Ellis graduated from Stone Bridge High School in 2008 and attended George Mason University (GMU) before finishing his degree through Appalachian State University. Ellis is a member of the Kappa Sigma fraternity. He used to serve as a resident Pro Racing Instructor at Allsports Grand Prix in Sterling, Virginia, hosts his own podcast, Not Another Racing Podcast with fellow NASCAR driver, Matt DiBenedetto. is a host on CBS/WJFK's weekly “In the Pits” radio talk show. Outside of racing, Ellis is an avid hockey player and has played professionally with the Potomac Mavericks of the PIHA and for the GMU college hockey team. Ellis also plays hockey recreationally with several adult hockey ice and inline leagues.  A dedicated fan of the National Hockey League's Washington Capitals, Ellis added an anti-Pittsburgh Penguins logo to the back of some of his helmets, before designing a Capitals-themed helmet in 2018 that eventually commemorated the team's first Stanley Cup victory. Ellis still plays hockey in Charlotte on a team with other NASCAR notables like Emmy-Winning Producer Christian Audesirk and JGR's Scott Simmons.

Images

Motorsports career results

NASCAR
(key) (Bold – Pole position awarded by qualifying time. Italics – Pole position earned by points standings or practice time. * – Most laps led.)

Cup Series

Xfinity Series

Camping World Truck Series

 Season still in progress
 Ineligible for series points

References

External links

 
 

1989 births
Living people
Sportspeople from Torrance, California
Racing drivers from California
Rolex Sports Car Series drivers
NASCAR drivers
People from Huntersville, North Carolina
People from Ashburn, Virginia